Rabbi Abraham ben Menasseh Aboab (Hebrew: רבי אברהם בן מנשה אבוהב; d. 1642) also known as Abraham Aboab V was a Western Sephardic Portuguese philanthropist and Rabbi, who was an early founder of the Portuguese Jewish community in Hamburg.

Biography 
Born to the Aboab family around 1560 in Lisbon, Portugal. His father Rav Menasseh Aboab was a crypto-Jew, and the son of Abraham Aboab IV. In his early years he went by his Christian alias "António Faleiro". He and his brother Jacob amassed great wealth by trading colonial commerce assets in Lisbon. To escape the Portuguese inquisition, he and his brother later moved to Antwerp, Belgium, where they reverted to the surname Aboab and headquartered an important family firm in which they imported sugar and spices from Portugal to Italy and Northern Europe. Abraham later married Ana Dinis, and the couple moved to Hamburg in 1611. In Hamburg, he built the second synagogue in that city, named "Keter Torah," for the Portuguese community, and founded several Yeshivah's both in Germany and in the Land of Israel with the wealth he had amassed. He was also granted a coat of arms. In 1625, he moved to Verona, where he died in 1642. He is the father of Samuel Aboab and the grandfather of Jacob Aboab.

References 

17th-century Sephardi Jews
German Sephardi Jews
Portuguese Jews
17th-century German rabbis
People from Lisbon
Rabbis from Hamburg